Alecia Kaorie "Sug" Sutton (born December 17, 1998) is an American basketball player who is currently a free agent in the Women's National Basketball Association (WNBA). Born in Saint Louis, Missouri, Huff went to Parkway North High School and played collegiately for the University of Texas. She was drafted by the Mystics with the 36th overall pick of the 2020 WNBA draft.

Texas statistics 

Source

Professional career

Sutton was drafted by the Washington Mystics with the 36th overall pick of the 2020 WNBA draft. On May 25, prior to the season's start, Sutton was released by the Mystics. On August 16, midway through the season, Sutton was again signed by the Mystics. On August 19, Sutton made her WNBA debut in a win against the Atlanta Dream and scored her first WNBA points. On May 13, 2021, she was waived by the Mystics.

WNBA career statistics

Regular season

|-
| align="left" | 2020
| align="left" | Washington
| 12 || 0 || 9.4 || .364 || .294 || .714 || 0.7 || 1.0 || 0.1 || 0.0 || 0.5 || 2.9
|-
| align="left" | Career
| align="left" | 1 year, 1 team
| 12 || 0 || 9.4 || .364 || .294 || .714 || 0.7 || 1.0 || 0.1 || 0.0 || 0.5 || 2.9

Playoffs

|-
| align="left" | 2020
| align="left" | Washington
| 1 || 0 || 4.0 || .500 || .000 || .000 || 1.0 || 0.0 || 0.0 || 0.0 || 0.0 || 2.0
|-
| align="left" | Career
| align="left" | 1 year, 1 team
| 1 || 0 || 4.0 || .500 || .000 || .000 || 1.0 || 0.0 || 0.0 || 0.0 || 0.0 || 2.0

Personal life
Sutton goes by "Sug," short for "Sugar." The nickname was given to her by her father and grandfather. Sutton's parents are Larry Sutton and Tonette Moore. At University of Texas, Sutton majored in health promotion and behavioral sciences.

References

External links
Texas Longhorns bio

1998 births
Living people
American women's basketball players
Basketball players from St. Louis
Point guards
Shooting guards
Texas Longhorns women's basketball players
Washington Mystics draft picks
Washington Mystics players